This article refers to one of the former prefectures of Chad. From 2002 the country was divided into 18 regions.

Tandjilé was one of the 14 prefectures of Chad. Located in the southwest of the country, Tandjilé covered an area of 18,045 square kilometers and had a population of 453,854 in 1993. Its capital was Laï.

References

Prefectures of Chad

fr:Tandjilé